Andrei Iurea (born 1 December 1996) is a Romanian former rugby union player. He most recently played as a lock for professional SuperLiga club Știința Baia Mare. He could also play as a flanker.

Club career
Andrei Iurea started playing rugby as a youth for a local Romanian club based in Pașcani, C.F.R. Pașcani, under the guidance of coach Nicolae Tarcan. After two years he moved to another local school based team, Clubul Sportiv Școlar Bârlad, playing there for a year. Starting with 2014 he played for two seasons for Clubul Sportiv Cleopatra Mamaia. In 2016 he was signed by SuperLiga side, Știința Baia Mare, form where he announced his retirement from the sport in October 2019.

International career
Iurea was also selected for Romania's national team, the Oaks, making his international debut at the 2016 World Rugby Nations Cup in a match against the Welwitschias.

References

External links
 
 
 

1996 births
Living people
People from Târgu Frumos
Romanian rugby union players
Romania international rugby union players
CSM Știința Baia Mare players
Rugby union locks
Rugby union flankers